High Springs is a city in Alachua County, Florida, United States. It is the fourth-largest city in Alachua County and seventh-largest in North Central Florida. The population was 6,215 at the 2020 census.

History

The present-day area of High Springs was first settled on a permanent basis by English-speaking people during the late 1830s. One of the earliest settlements in the vicinity was at Crockett Springs, located about three miles east of present-day High Springs. Settlers who were living there during the 1840s included Fernando Underwood and Marshal Blanton. A discernible town began to develop in the early 1880s after the Savannah, Florida & Western Railway was constructed and several phosphate mines were established. A railroad station and a post office called Santaffey were established in 1884. The post office was renamed Santa Fe a few months later, then Orion the next year, and in 1888 it became High Springs, and the town was officially incorporated in 1892. The town had a population over 1,500 at the end of the 1890s and was the second largest by population in the county.

Geography

High Springs is located at  (29.8245, –82.5953).

Climate

Demographics

As of the census of 2000, there were 3,863 people, 1,539 households, and 1,063 families residing in the city. The racial makeup of the city was 76.42% White, 21.18% African American, 0.39% Native American, 0.34% Asian, 0.31% from other races, and 1.37% from two or more races. Hispanic or Latino of any race were .02% and Cubans were 4.1 of the population.

There were 1,539 households, out of which 32.1% had children under the age of 18 living with them, 50.3% were married couples living together, 14.5% had a female householder with no husband present, and 30.9% were non-families. 25.9% of all households were made up of individuals, and 12.3% had someone living alone who was 65 years of age or older.  The average household size was 2.47 and the average family size was 2.98.

In the city, the population was spread out, with 25.4% under the age of 18, 6.2% from 18 to 24, 27.6% from 25 to 44, 25.0% from 45 to 64, and 15.7% who were 65 years of age or older.  The median age was 39 years. For every 100 females, there were 85.5 males.  For every 100 females age 18 and over, there were 81.4 males.

The median income for a household in the city was $34,354, and the median income for a family was $43,779. Males had a median income of $32,959 versus $22,109 for females. The per capita income for the city was $15,919.  About 9.5% of families and 12.0% of the population were below the poverty line, including 17.8% of those under age 18 and 9.6% of those age 65 or over. On many days during the week, hundreds of cars are lined up in the city’s downtown for a free food distribution.

Education

The School Board of Alachua County operates a kindergarten through eighth grade school, the High Springs Community School, in High Springs. Ninth through twelfth grade students attend Santa Fe High School in the adjoining city of Alachua.

Library 
The Alachua County Library District operates a branch library on NW 1st Avenue in downtown, High Springs. The library is open 7 days a week, provides regular programming for all ages, and circulates print books, audiobooks, music CDs, and DVDs. Free computer and internet access is available to all patrons.

In 1958, the North Florida Telephone Company offered the loan of its vacant building to the High Springs Parent-Teacher Association for the creation of the first Alachua County branch library located outside of Gainesville. The High Springs Library opened at this location the following year. After years of community fund raising, ground was broken in 1976 for a new 3,000 sq. ft. library building. The second and current library location opened its doors on January 3, 1977. Children from High Springs formed a block-long human chain to move the book collection from the old library to the new one.

References

External links
City of High Springs official website
High Springs Chamber of Commerce
High Springs Blog - The Official Site of Commissioner Eric May
High Springs Branch Library

Cities in Alachua County, Florida
Gainesville metropolitan area, Florida
Populated places established in the 1880s
Cities in Florida
1892 establishments in Florida